Hentziectypus is a genus of comb-footed spiders that was first described by Allan Frost Archer in 1946. Originally placed with Theridion, it was moved to Achaearanea in 1955, and to its own genus in 2008. These spiders most resemble members of Cryptachaea, but are distinguished by a median apophysis that is broadly attached to the tegulum. Spiders of Parasteatoda have a median apophysis attached to the embolus, while those of Achaearanea have a hooked paracymbium on the pedipalps of males.

Species
 it contains twelve species, found in the Americas and in the Caribbean, including Cuba, Jamaica, Panama, and Bermuda:
Hentziectypus annus (Levi, 1959) – Jamaica, Bermuda
Hentziectypus apex (Levi, 1959) – Panama
Hentziectypus conjunctus (Gertsch & Mulaik, 1936) – USA, Canada
Hentziectypus florendidus (Levi, 1959) – USA to Venezuela
Hentziectypus florens (O. Pickard-Cambridge, 1896) – USA to Panama, Cuba
Hentziectypus globosus (Hentz, 1850) (type) – North America
Hentziectypus hermosillo (Levi, 1959) – Mexico
Hentziectypus rafaeli (Buckup & Marques, 1991) – Bolivia, Brazil
Hentziectypus schullei (Gertsch & Mulaik, 1936) – USA, Mexico
Hentziectypus serax (Levi, 1959) – Mexico
Hentziectypus tayrona Buckup, Marques & Rodrigues, 2012 – Colombia
Hentziectypus turquino (Levi, 1959) – Cuba

In synonymy:
H. credulus (Gertsch & Davis, 1936) = Hentziectypus schullei (Gertsch & Mulaik, 1936)
H. mendax (O. Pickard-Cambridge, 1899) = Hentziectypus florens (O. Pickard-Cambridge, 1896)

See also
 List of Theridiidae species

References

Araneomorphae genera
Spiders of North America
Spiders of South America
Theridiidae